Waste of Mind is the second studio album and major label debut by American punk rock band Zebrahead. The song "Check" was featured on the soundtrack of the video game Tony Hawk's Pro Skater 3.

Track listing

Singles 
 "Get Back" – released as the lead single from the album in late 1998, it sold over 150,000 copies alone in the United States and is currently the band's highest charting song yet, peaking at number 32 on the US Hot Modern Rock Tracks charts. The single was also released overseas in Australia, Japan and Canada, a music video accompanied its release.
 "The Real Me" – released as the second single in the US and Japan in early 1999, the majority of radio airplay of the song was received in California, US.
 "Feel This Way" – released as the third single from the album in the summer of 1999, exclusively in Japan.
 "Someday" – the third US and fourth and final single overall, received little airplay from radio stations, seeing as only a few copies were sent out during the late summer/early fall of 1999.

Personnel 
 Ali Tabatabaee – lead vocals
 Justin Mauriello – lead vocals, rhythm guitar
 Greg Bergdorf – lead guitar
 Ben Osmundson – bass guitar
 Ed Udhus – drums
 Howard Benson – producer, keyboards

Charts

References

External links 
 Zebrahead band website

Zebrahead albums
1998 albums
Columbia Records albums
Albums produced by Howard Benson